Jessica Thornton (born 12 April 1998) is an Australian track and field sprinter who competes in the 200 metres and 400 metres. She represented her country at the 2016 Summer Olympics. She holds a personal best of 52.05 seconds for the 400 m.

She was born in Randwick, New South Wales and studied nutrition science at the University of Wollongong. Thornton won the 400 m at the 2014 Summer Youth Olympics, setting a personal best of 52.50 seconds to beat Bahrain's Salwa Eid Naser.  She ran for the Asia-Pacific relay team at the 2014 IAAF Continental Cup, though the team finished last. She was a relay finalist at the 2016 Summer Olympics alongside Anneliese Rubie, Caitlin Sargent and Morgan Mitchell.

International competitions

References

External links

 

Living people
1998 births
People from the Eastern Suburbs (Sydney)
Athletes from Sydney
Australian female sprinters
Olympic athletes of Australia
Athletes (track and field) at the 2016 Summer Olympics
Athletes (track and field) at the 2014 Summer Youth Olympics
Youth Olympic gold medalists for Australia
Youth Olympic gold medalists in athletics (track and field)
Olympic female sprinters